Utamaro and His Five Women   is a 1946 Japanese historical drama film directed by Kenji Mizoguchi. It is based on the novel of the same title by Kanji Kunieda, itself a fictionalized account of the life of printmaker Kitagawa Utamaro.

Synopsis
Edo (now Tōkyō) in the 18th century. During a parade of samurai and their families and concubines, Seinosuke Koide, a samurai and artist affiliated to a Kanō school master, visits a print shop where he sees a woodcut print by Utamaro that boasts the superiority of his ukiyo-e style over the prevailing Chinese style. Enraged, he goes searching for Utamaro, announcing to teach him a lesson or even kill him. Utamaro, although having been warned, meets Koide in a tea-house where he proposes a painting contest instead of a sword duel, to which his pursuer agrees. Koide subsequently acknowledges Utamaro's superiority and declares him the winner, following him as a disciple.

Utamaro hears that Edo's best tattoo artist lacks the confidence to draw on the back of courtesan Orui, who is famous for her beauty. He asks her permission to paint directly onto her back for the tattoo artist to then tattoo over, which she proudly accepts. Shozaburo, son of a wholesaler, falls in love with Orui and elopes with her to the countryside, leaving behind his fiancée Okita, who was once a model for Utamaro.

Utamaro goes to a lake-side with his friends and spies Oran, the beautiful daughter of a commoner, amongst a group of bathing girls. He takes her to be his new model. Later, he is sentenced to 50 days in handcuffs for a series of prints on Toyotomi Hideyoshi which offended the officials.

Okita tracks down Shozaburo and Orui and takes him back to Edo, but later discovers he is still seeing Orui. She stabs both to death, then goes to Utamaro's house explaining that, although she knows she will face capital punishment for the crime, she had to be true to her own feelings. Utamaro has eventually his handcuffs removed and instantly returns to drawing. The film ends with a collection of his most famous prints falling one by one in front of the camera.

Cast
 Minosuke Bandō – Otamaru
 Kōtarō Bandō – Seinosuke Koide
 Shotaro Nakamura – Shozaburo
 Kinuyo Tanaka – Okita, Shozaburo's fiancée
 Eiko Ohara – Yukie, Seinosuke's fiancée
 Toshiko Iizuka – Orui, the tattooed courtesan
 Hiroko Kawasaki – Oran, the daughter of a commoner
 Kiniko Shiratao – Oshin, the brothel keeper

Background
Utamaro and His Five Women was made during the seven-year Allied occupation of Japan which followed World War II. At the time, film production was overseen by representatives of the occupation forces, and jidaigeki (period films) were rarely made, as they were seen as being inherently nationalistic or militaristic. In order to receive permittance to make the film, Mizoguchi argued that Utamaro was "a popular democratic painter" and agreed to emphasize the topic of female emancipation.

Though Utamaro and His Five Women is based on the life of Kitagawa Utamaro, it has frequently been viewed as an autobiographical work by critics. In her 2003 article for Senses of Cinema, Freda Freiberg wrote: "The equation Utamaro=Mizoguchi has been irresistible to most critics as the two artists did have a lot in common. Both of them worked in a popular mass-produced medium operated by businessmen, and chafed under oppressive censorship regimes; both frequented the pleasure quarters and sought the company of geishas; but, most significantly, they both achieved fame for their portraits of women."

Reception
Initially, Japanese critics believed that the film didn't live up to the director's usual high standards, an opinion which was in parts re-evaluated in later years. The reviews by contemporary Western critics collected on Rotten Tomatoes regard Utamaro and His Five Women as an interesting, though not major work by Mizoguchi. Film scholar Alexander Jacoby called it the "mellowest work" the director made during the Occupation years. In his review for Time Out, Tony Rayns rated it as "less emotional, more formalised, more mysterious, and a great deal more daring aestethically" than Mizoguchi's later films.

See also
 Kōmei Bijin Rokkasen, a series of prints by Utamaro depicting women of Edo's pleasure district

Notes

References

External links
 

1946 films
1946 drama films
Biographical films about artists
Films directed by Kenji Mizoguchi
1940s Japanese-language films
Jidaigeki films
Shochiku films
Films with screenplays by Yoshikata Yoda
Cultural depictions of Japanese men
Cultural depictions of 18th-century painters
Cultural depictions of 19th-century painters
Japanese drama films
Japanese black-and-white films